The Great Gatsby is a 1925 novel by F. Scott Fitzgerald.

The Great Gatsby may also refer to:

Film and television
 The Great Gatsby (1926 film), a silent film starring Warner Baxter and Lois Wilson
 The Great Gatsby (1949 film), a film starring Alan Ladd and Betty Field 
 The Great Gatsby (1974 film), a film starring Robert Redford and Mia Farrow
 The Great Gatsby (2000 film), a TV film starring Toby Stephens, Mira Sorvino, and Paul Rudd
 The Great Gatsby (2013 film), a film starring Leonardo DiCaprio and Tobey Maguire
 "The Great Gatsby", a 1955 episode of Robert Montgomery Presents
 "The Great Gatsby", a 1958 episode of Playhouse 90

Music
 The Great Gatsby (opera), a 1999 opera by John Harbison
 The Great Gatsby: Music from Baz Luhrmann's Film, a soundtrack album from the 2013 film

See also
 G (2002 film), a 2002 film by Christopher Scott Cherot
 Gatsby (disambiguation)
 The Great Catsby, a South Korean web comic by Doha
 Great Gatsby curve, a chart which plots economic inequality versus social mobility
 The Great Phatsby, a Simpsons episode